Van Kirk may refer to:

Theodore Van Kirk (1921–2014), United States Air Force officer and navigator
Van Kirk Farm, historic farm in Elizabeth Township, Allegheny County, Pennsylvania